Queen's was a federal electoral district in Prince Edward Island, Canada, that was represented in the House of Commons of Canada from 1904 to 1968.

History

This riding was created in 1903 from parts of East Prince, East Queen's and West Queen's ridings.

It was abolished in 1966 when it was redistributed into Cardigan,  Hillsborough and Malpeque ridings, to take effect at the time of the next election (which took place in 1968).

It consisted of the County of Queen's and elected two members. In 1914, it was redefined to elect only one member unless the British North America Act, 1867, were amended to entitle the province of Prince Edward Island to four members. When that happened, before the next election, Queen's again was entitled to elect two members. It continued to have two members until it was abolished in 1966.

It elected its MPs through Block Voting.

Members of Parliament

This riding has elected the following Members of Parliament:

Election results

See also 

 List of Canadian federal electoral districts
 Past Canadian electoral districts

External links 
Riding history for Queen's (1903–1966) from the Library of Parliament

Former federal electoral districts of Prince Edward Island